William de Groat is an American bioscientist, focusing in neuropharmacology and pharmacology of cell and nervous systems, currently Distinguished Professor at University of Pittsburgh.

References

Year of birth missing (living people)
Living people
University of Pittsburgh faculty
American pharmacologists